Sukhen Dey (born 1 January 1990) is an Indian footballer who currently plays as a defender for Mohun Bagan in the I-League.

Career

Prayag United
During the summer of 2011 Dey signed his first contract with Prayag United S.C. of the I-League. He made his professional debut against Chirag United Club Kerala during the 2011 Indian Federation Cup on 18 September 2011. He then made his I-League debut for Prayag against Sporting Clube de Goa on 23 October 2011.

Career statistics

Club

References

Indian footballers
1990 births
Living people
I-League players
United SC players
Footballers from West Bengal
Association football fullbacks